Robert Almer Harper (January 21, 1862 – May 12, 1946) was an American botanist.

The younger brother of Edward Thompson Harper, Robert was born in Le Claire, Iowa to Congressional Minister Almer Harper and Eunice Thompson. The family moved to Port Byron, Illinois in 1863, where Robert attended local schools. He matriculated to Oberlin College, his father's alma mater, where he graduated with a A. B. in 1886. During the Fall of 1886 he performed graduate studies at Johns Hopkins University, then he was professor of Greek and Latin at Gates College in Neligh, Nebraska during 1886–88.

In 1889–91 he was an instructor at the Lake Forest Academy. After receiving his A. M. degree from Oberlin, he was appointed professor of botany and geology in 1891–98 at Lake Forest University. During the period 1894 to 1896, took a sabbatical to attend graduate school at the University of Bonn in Germany where he studied cytology and mycology; he was awarded a Ph.D. in 1896.

Harper became Professor of Botany at the University of Wisconsin in 1898, where he taught until 1911. On June 25, 1899, he was married to Alice Jean McQueen; she died in 1909. After a stint as visiting professor at the University of California in 1911, he was named Torrey Professor of Botany at Columbia University, becoming head of the botany department. The same year, Professor Harper was named a fellow of the American Academy of Arts and Sciences.

A member of the Torrey Botanical Club since 1911, he was named president during 1914–16. He served as president of the Botanical Society of America in 1916. Harper remarried in 1918 to Helen Sherman; they had one son, who became a farmer in Bedford, Virginia. Beginning in 1918, he served as head of the board of scientific directors for the New York Botanical Garden. He was named professor emeritus in 1930, then in 1938 he retired to a farm in Bedford. During his career he was awarded honorary doctorates from Columbia University and the University of Pennsylvania.

Bibliography
He published the following works:

 Opuscula, 1895
 Beitrag zur Kenntniss der Kerntheilung und Sporenbildung, 1896
 Die Entwickelung des Peritheciums bei Sphaerotheca Castagnei, 1896
 Ueber das Verhalten der Kerne bei der Fruchtentwickelung einiger Ascomyceten, 1896
 Kerntheilung und freie Zellbildung, 1897
 Cell-division in Sporangia and Asci, 1899
 Cell and Nuclear division in Fuligo varians, 1900
 Binucleate cells in certain Hymenomycetes, 1902
 Nuclear divisions and nuclear fusion in Coloesporium sonchi-arvensis, 1903, with R. J. Holden
 Hamilton Greenwood Timberlake, 1904
 Sexual Reproduction and the Organization of the Nucleus in Certain Mildews, 1905
 Sex-determining factors in plants, 1907
 The Organization of Certain Coenobic Plants, 1908
 Nuclear phenomena of sexual reproduction in fungi, 1910
 The structure and development of the colony in Gonium, 1912
 Some current conceptions of the germ plasm, 1912
 Cleavage in Didymium mclanospermum, 1914
 Physical factors in cleavage of coenocytes, 1914
 Starchy and sugary foods, 1914
 On the nature of types in Pediastrum, 1916
 Organization reproduction and inheritance in Pediastrum, 1918
 The evolution of cell types and contact and pressure responses in Pediastrum, 1918
 Binary fission and surface tension in the development of the colony in Volvox, 1918
 The structure of protoplasm, 1919
 Inheritance of sugar and starch characters in corn, 1920
 The Stimulation of Research after the War, 1920
 The species concept from the point of view of a morphologist, 1923
 Cytology, 1924
 Morphogenesis in Dictyostelium, 1926
 Significance of taxonomic units and their natural basis, 1929
 Morphogenesis in Polysphondylium, 1929
 The nature and functions of plastids, especially elaioplasts, 1929
 Organization and light relations in Polysphondylium, 1932
 Plant Science in the Service of Art, 1933

References

1862 births
1946 deaths
People from Le Claire, Iowa
American botanists
Oberlin College alumni
University of Bonn alumni
People from Rock Island County, Illinois